The coenzyme Q : cytochrome c – oxidoreductase, sometimes called the cytochrome bc1 complex, and at other times complex III, is the third complex in the electron transport chain, playing a critical role in biochemical generation of ATP (oxidative phosphorylation). Complex III is a multisubunit transmembrane protein encoded by both the mitochondrial (cytochrome b) and the nuclear genomes (all other subunits). Complex III is present in the mitochondria of all animals and all aerobic eukaryotes and the inner membranes of most eubacteria. Mutations in Complex III cause exercise intolerance as well as multisystem disorders. The bc1 complex contains 11 subunits, 3 respiratory subunits (cytochrome B, cytochrome C1, Rieske protein), 2 core proteins and 6 low-molecular weight proteins.

Ubiquinol—cytochrome-c reductase catalyzes the chemical reaction

QH2 + 2 ferricytochrome c  Q + 2 ferrocytochrome c + 2 H+

Thus, the two substrates of this enzyme are quinol (QH2) and ferri- (Fe3+) cytochrome c, whereas its 3 products are quinone (Q), ferro- (Fe2+) cytochrome c, and H+.

This enzyme belongs to the family of oxidoreductases, specifically those acting on diphenols and related substances as donor with a cytochrome as acceptor.  This enzyme participates in oxidative phosphorylation.  It has four cofactors: cytochrome c1, cytochrome b-562, cytochrome b-566, and a 2-Iron ferredoxin of the Rieske type.

Nomenclature 

The systematic name of this enzyme class is ubiquinol:ferricytochrome-c oxidoreductase.  Other names in common use include:

Structure 

Compared to the other major proton-pumping subunits of the electron transport chain, the number of subunits found can be small, as small as three polypeptide chains. This number does increase, and eleven subunits are found in higher animals. Three subunits have prosthetic groups. The cytochrome b subunit has two b-type hemes (bL and bH), the cytochrome c subunit has one c-type heme (c1), and the Rieske Iron Sulfur Protein subunit (ISP) has a two iron, two sulfur iron-sulfur cluster (2Fe•2S).

Structures of complex III: ,

Composition of complex 

In vertebrates the bc1 complex, or Complex III, contains 11 subunits: 3 respiratory subunits, 2 core proteins and 6 low-molecular weight proteins. Proteobacterial complexes may contain as few as three subunits.

Table of subunit composition of complex III 

 a In vertebrates, a cleavage product of 8 kDa from the N-terminus of the Rieske protein (Signal peptide) is retained in the complex as subunit 9. Thus subunits 10 and 11 correspond to fungal QCR9p and QCR10p.

Reaction 
It catalyzes the reduction of cytochrome c by
oxidation of coenzyme Q (CoQ) and the concomitant pumping of 4 protons from the mitochondrial matrix to the intermembrane space:

 QH2 + 2 cytochrome c (FeIII)  + 2 H → Q + 2 cytochrome c (FeII) + 4 H

In the process called Q cycle, two protons are consumed from the matrix (M), four protons are released into the inter membrane space (IM) and two electrons are passed to cytochrome c.

Reaction mechanism 

The reaction mechanism for complex III (cytochrome bc1, coenzyme Q: cytochrome C oxidoreductase) is known as the ubiquinone ("Q") cycle. In this cycle four protons get released into the positive "P" side (inter membrane space), but only two protons get taken up from the negative "N" side (matrix). As a result, a proton gradient is formed across the membrane.  In the overall reaction, two ubiquinols are oxidized to ubiquinones and one ubiquinone is reduced to ubiquinol. In the complete mechanism, two electrons are transferred from ubiquinol to ubiquinone, via two cytochrome c intermediates.

Overall:
 2 x QH2 oxidised to Q
 1 x Q reduced to QH2
 2 x Cyt c reduced
 4 x H+ released into intermembrane space
 2 x H+ picked up from matrix

The reaction proceeds according to the following steps:

Round 1:
 Cytochrome b binds a ubiquinol and a ubiquinone.
 The 2Fe/2S center and BL heme each pull an electron off the bound ubiquinol, releasing two protons into the intermembrane space.
 One electron is transferred to cytochrome c1 from the 2Fe/2S centre, whilst another is transferred from the BL heme to the BH Heme.
 Cytochrome c1 transfers its electron to cytochrome c (not to be confused with cytochrome c1), and the BH Heme transfers its electron to a nearby ubiquinone, resulting in the formation of a ubisemiquinone.
 Cytochrome c diffuses. The first ubiquinol (now oxidised to ubiquinone) is released, whilst the semiquinone remains bound.
Round 2:
 A second ubiquinol is bound by cytochrome b.
 The 2Fe/2S center and BL heme each pull an electron off the bound ubiquinol, releasing two protons into the intermembrane space.
 One electron is transferred to cytochrome c1 from the 2Fe/2S centre, whilst another is transferred from the BL heme to the BH Heme.
 Cytochrome c1 then transfers its electron to cytochrome c, whilst the nearby semiquinone produced from round 1 picks up a second electron from the BH heme, along with two protons from the matrix.
 The second ubiquinol (now oxidised to ubiquinone), along with the newly formed ubiquinol are released.

Inhibitors of complex III 
There are three distinct groups of Complex III inhibitors.
 Antimycin A binds to the Qi site and inhibits the transfer of electrons in Complex III from heme bH to oxidized Q (Qi site inhibitor).
 Myxothiazol and stigmatellin binds to the Qo site and inhibits the transfer of electrons from reduced QH2 to the Rieske Iron sulfur protein. Myxothiazol and stigmatellin bind to distinct but overlapping pockets within the Qo site.
 Myxothiazol binds nearer to cytochrome bL (hence termed a "proximal" inhibitor).
 Stigmatellin binds farther from heme bL and nearer the Rieske Iron sulfur protein, with which it strongly interacts.

Some have been commercialized as fungicides (the strobilurin derivatives, best known of which is azoxystrobin; QoI inhibitors) and as anti-malaria agents (atovaquone).

Also propylhexedrine inhibits cytochrome c reductase.

Oxygen free radicals 
A small fraction of electrons leave the electron transport chain before reaching complex IV. Premature electron leakage to oxygen results in the formation of superoxide. The relevance of this otherwise minor side reaction is that superoxide and other reactive oxygen species are highly toxic and are thought to play a role in several pathologies, as well as aging (the free radical theory of aging). Electron leakage occurs mainly at the Qo site and is stimulated by antimycin A. Antimycin A locks the b hemes in the reduced state by preventing their re-oxidation at the Qi site, which, in turn, causes the steady-state concentrations of the Qo semiquinone to rise, the latter species reacting with oxygen to form superoxide. The effect of high membrane potential is thought to have a similar effect. Superoxide produced at the Qo site can be released both into the mitochondrial matrix and into the intermembrane space, where it can then reach the cytosol. This could be explained by the fact that Complex III might produce superoxide as membrane permeable HOO• rather than as membrane impermeable O.

Human gene names 

MT-CYB: mtDNA encoded cytochrome b; mutations associated with exercise intolerance

CYC1: cytochrome c1

CYCS: cytochrome c

UQCRFS1: Rieske iron sulfur protein

UQCRB: Ubiquinone binding protein, mutation linked with mitochondrial complex III deficiency nuclear type 3

UQCRH: hinge protein

UQCRC2: Core 2, mutations linked to mitochondrial complex III deficiency, nuclear type 5

UQCRC1: Core 1

UQCR: 6.4KD subunit

UQCR10: 7.2KD subunit

TTC19: Newly identified subunit, mutations linked to complex III deficiency nuclear type 2.

Mutations in complex III genes in human disease 

Mutations in complex III-related genes typically manifest as exercise intolerance.  Other mutations have been reported to cause septo-optic dysplasia and multisystem disorders. However, mutations in BCS1L, a gene responsible for proper maturation of complex III, can result in Björnstad syndrome and the GRACILE syndrome, which in neonates are lethal conditions that have multisystem and neurologic manifestations typifying severe mitochondrial disorders. The pathogenicity of several mutations has been verified in model systems such as yeast.

The extent to which these various pathologies are due to bioenergetic deficits or overproduction of superoxide is presently unknown.

See also 
 Cellular respiration
 Photosynthetic reaction centre

Additional images

References

Further reading

External links 
  at lbl.gov
 cytochrome bc1 complex site (Antony R. Crofts) at uiuc.edu
  at scripps.edu
  (Requires MDL Chime)
  - Calculated positions of bc1 and related complexes in membranes
 

EC 7.1.1
Enzymes of known structure
Cellular respiration
Iron–sulfur proteins
Transmembrane proteins